Negombo is a major city in Sri Lanka, situated on the west coast and at the mouth of the Negombo Lagoon, in the Western Province,  from Colombo via Colombo - Katunayake Expressway.

Negombo is one of the major commercial hubs in the country and the administrative centre of Negombo Division. Negombo has about 142,136 population within its divisional secretariat division. Negombo municipal boundary is fully extended throughout its Divisional Secretariat area.

Negombo is known for its long sandy beaches and centuries old fishing industry. Negombo has a large bilingual (Sinhala/Tamil) population with a clear Roman Catholic majority.

Etymology 
The name "Negombo" is the Portuguese corruption of its Tamil name Neerkolombu.

The Sinhala name  means from Old-Tamil Naval terminology Meegaman Pattinam. Meegaman denotes Naval Captain, where the local Karava population’s long association of Naval and Fishing connections. Later,  "Village of the honeycomb", gaining its name from a legend mentioned in Rajaveliya. The army of King Kavantissa found bee honey in a canoe near the seashore, for Viharamahadevi who was pregnant with the prince Dutugamunu. Because of this, the place was named "Mee-Gomuwa".

History 
The shallow waters of the Negombo Lagoon provided safe shelter for seafaring vessels and became one of the key ports along with Kalpitiya, Puttalam, Colombo, Kalutara and Galle, from which the Sri Lankan kingdoms conducted external trade.

Pre-colonialism 
The regional Jaffna kings, who controlled small parts of the northwest coast of Sri Lanka, built fortifications at Negombo, Colombo and Chilaw. The language used in and around Negombo was Tamil when the Portuguese colonisers arrived in the 16th century.

Negombo also served as a shelter for Arabic vessels, whose descendants are the Sri Lankan Moors. Negombo was a major port known for its trading activity and was well known for its cinnamon cultivation. The cinnamon trade was controlled by the Sri Lankan  kings and later by the Sri Lankan Moors.

Portuguese Ceylon 
Landing in the early 1500s, the Portuguese overthrew the Jaffna Kingdom, constructed a fort in Negombo and took over the trade of cinnamon to the west. During the Portuguese occupation, the Karava (the dominant seafaring clan of Negombo), who were previously Buddhist and Hindu were converted into Catholicism. Due to the sheer amount of conversions to Catholicism, present-day Negombo is sometimes known as 'Little Rome' due to nearly two thirds of its population being Catholic.

The Portuguese restructured the traditional production and management of cinnamon and maintained their control over the trade for more than a century. The decline of their power began in the 1630s when warfare between the Portuguese and the Kingdom of Kandy reached a stalemate. The King of Kandy turned to the Dutch for help.

Dutch Ceylon

The Dutch captured Negombo from the Portuguese in 1646 and negotiated an armistice with Portugal for ten years. During this period, the King of Kandy sought to provoke conflict between the nations by passing through the territories of the one to attack the other. On one occasion, he captured the fort of Negombo and sent the head of the Dutch commander, Adrian Vander Stell, to his countrymen in Galle. Although the Dutch managed to regain control of Negombo from the King by diplomatic means, hostilities continued. In particular, the disruption of the cinnamon trade was a favourite method of the King to harass the Dutch.

Throughout the eighteenth century, the demand for cinnamon from Ceylon outstripped the supply, and its quality appeared to have suffered. Other factors, including the continued hostility from the Kandyan Kingdom and a rival cinnamon exporter in the form of China, led to a 40% decline in the volume of cinnamon exported between 1785 and 1791, despite attempts to clear land around Negombo and create cinnamon plantations.

The legacy of the Dutch colonial era can be seen in the Negombo fort, constructed in 1672, and other Dutch buildings, including churches and the extensive canal system that runs  from Colombo in the south, through Negombo to Puttalam in the north.

British Ceylon
By the time the British commander Colonel Stuart took over the cinnamon trade in 1796, it was clear that the industry was in decline. Poor policies put in place by Frederick North the first Governor of British Ceylon exacerbated the problem. By the 1830s, commercial interest had moved elsewhere.

Following the British takeover of the Kingdom of Kandy in 1815, Negombo lost its strategic value as an outpost of Colombo. However, it continued to develop in commercial influence. The Negombo fishery was at the heart of the seafood trade in Ceylon, and many migrant fisherman arrived annually with the profits of their ventures going into the small, prosperous town. In 1907 Negombo was connected to the massive railway project that was linking the island together under British control and encouraging the growth of plantations in coconuts, tea and coffee.

Geography 

The Hamilton Canal flows in the heart of the city. The Negombo Lagoon is one of the most scenic landmarks of Negombo. There are over 190 species of wildlife and plenty of birds in its mangroves. The northern border of the city is formed by the Maha Oya river which meets the Indian Ocean.

Climate
Negombo features a tropical rainforest climate under the Köppen climate classification. The city receives rainfall mainly from the Southwestern monsoons from May to August and October to January. During the remaining months there is a little precipitation due to Convective rains.

Zones and neighbourhoods

Zones 

Athgala
Basiyawatte
Bolawalana  
Dalupotha 
Daluwakotuwa
Dungalpitiya
Duwa
Duwane
Ethukala 
Kadolkale
Kamachchodai 
Kandawala
Kapumgoda
Kattuwa 
Katunayake 
Katuwapitiya 
Kimbulapitiya 
Kochchikade
Kurana  
Kudapadu
Mahahunupitiya, also known as Maha Hunupitiya, a predominantly Catholic neighborhood
Munnakkarai 
Muruthena
Nugawala
Palangathura
Pallansena
Periyamulla  
Pitipana 
Poruthota
Raheemanabad  
Sarakkuwa
Sellakanda
Thillanduwa
Thaladuwa
Thalahena
Udyar Thoppu  
Wella veediya
Welihena
Kadirana
Akkarapanaha
Thimbirigaskatuwa
Katana

Neighborhoods 

Depot Junction 
Dheen Junction 
Galkanda Junction 
Koppara Junction 
Light Mill Junction 
Pankada Junction 
Periyamulla Junction 
Taladuwa Junction 
Telwatta Junction 
Temple Junction

Transport 

The E03 - Airport Expressway opened in 2013 links the capital Colombo through the Katunayake Interchange with Negombo minimising travelling time to approximately 20 to 30 minutes. The Katunayake Interchange from Negombo takes about 5 to 10 minutes (approximately ). 

There are highway bus services running between from Negombo to Pettah, Maharagama via Airport Expressway. Negombo to Galle, Kataragama and Matara (the southern tip of the country)  using the Southern Expressway . And also bus services provided Negombo to Kadawatha, Kottawa, Panadura and Moratuwa using the Outer Circular Expressway 

The A3 Colombo - Negombo highway road from Colombo, goes through Negombo, extends to Jaffna, and Trincomalee via Anuradhapura. Negombo is connected with some of the B grade roads from Ja-Ela, Kurunegala, Mirigama, Nittambuwa and Giriulla, and there is a good road network in and around Negombo.

The Bus Terminal complex of Negombo has multiple facilities for passengers and public. It is served by many bus routes, connecting with some major destinations in the country, provided Negombo to Colombo, Kandy, Kegalle, Kataragama, Hatton, Kalpitiya, Chilaw, Kurunegala, Puttalam, Avissawella, and Kaluthara.

Due to Negombo being situated along A3 Highway Road, it is served by many bus routes from Colombo to Northern and North western points of Sri Lanka including Jaffna, Anuradhapura, Vavuniya, Kilinochchi, Mullaitivu, Mannar, Point Pedro, Nikaweratiya, Panduwasnuwara, Anamaduwa, Kankasanthurai, Pulmudei, Silawathurai, Velvetithurai and Padaviya .

Four railway stations serve Negombo, they are: Kurana, Negombo Downtown, Kattuwa and Kochchikade. Negombo Downtown Station is the main railway station on the Puttalam railway line. It serves Galle, via Colombo from south and to Puttalam, via Chilaw from north. The Sri Lanka Railway Department has introduced an intercity express train between Chilaw and Colombo with stops at Negombo Downtown and Kochchikade Stations.

The Negombo Downtown Station is close to the central Bus Terminal Complex. Negombo is the closest major city to the Bandaranaike International Airport and Katunayake Interchange of the E03 - Airport Expressway.

Negombo Lagoon 

The Negombo lagoon is large semi-enclosed coastal water body with plenty of natural resources. The lagoon is fed by number of small rivers and the Dutch canal. It is linked to the Indian Ocean by a narrow channel to the north, near Negombo. The lagoon and the marsh land area also support local agriculture and forestry. It has extensive mangrove swamps and attracts a wide variety of water birds. The lagoon supports so many distinct species of flora, fauna and as well as another species of birds and variety of animals. Negombo Lagoon is a major local and tourist attraction primarily for sightseeing and boating tours.

The fishermen who are based at the Negombo lagoon live in shanty thatch palm villages along the water's edge. They rely mainly on their traditional knowledge of the seasons for their livelihood, using outrigger canoes carved out of tree trunks and nylon nets to bring in modest catches from September through April. Their boats are made in two forms – oruvas (a type of sailing canoe) and paruvas (a large, man-powered catamaran fitted with kurlon dividers). In recent years, the villagers have supplemented the income earned from fishing by collecting 'toddy', or palm sap, which is used to brew arrack.

Demographics 
According by the statistics of 2011, 6.3% of the population of Gampaha district live in Negombo city limits and 11.6% of the population of the district live in Negombo Metropolis. It is a multi-ethnic and multi-cultural city. Most of Negombo's residents belong to the Sinhalese majority. There are Tamil and Muslim people also living in the city. Though almost all of the residents living in Negambo are Sri Lankans there are small foreign communities that are present in the city, most notably the Chinese community.

Religion 
Negombo is a multi-religious city. Since the beginning of European colonization, the township of Negombo has had a majority of Roman Catholics along with Buddhists, Hindus and Muslims.

Catholic and Christian Churches 

Negombo has been given the name Little Rome due to the highly ornate Portuguese-era Roman Catholic churches such as St. Mary's Church, Negombo found in the township and because the majority are the Roman Catholics. St. Sebastian's Church, Katuwapitiya, Saint Stephen’s Church, Negombo, Grand Street St. Mary's Church, Negombo, St. Anne's Churces at Kurana and Palangatura, St. Anthony's Church Dalupotha and Our Lady of Sorrows Church, Kandawala are the biggest parishes in Negombo. There are over 25 Roman Catholic Churches in the city.

There is a branch of the Church of Jesus Christ of Latter-day Saints in Negombo. The church building is just west of the intersection of Ave Maria Street and Old Chilaw Street. There are also Methodist churches, Baptist churches, and the other Anglican churches in Negombo.

Buddhist Pansal (Buddhist temples) 
Agurukaramulla Raja Maha Viharaya (Bodhirajaramaya) is a famous Buddhist temple bringing Buddhists from all over Sri Lanka to Negombo every year. Abhayasekararamaya Temple (Podipansala), Sri Sudarshanaramaya, Dutugamunu viharaya and Sri Buddhagaya maha viharaya are famous Buddhist temples in the city.

Hindu Kovil (Hindu temples) 
There are many Hindu temples (Kovil) in Negombo: Kali Amman temple, Ganapathi (Pillaiar) Temple, Kamachchi Amman Temple, Muththumari Amman Temple, Murugan (Kandaswami) Temple, Karumari Amman Temple etc.

Muslim Masjid (Mosques) 

There are nine Jummah Mosques in Negombo. The Kamachchoda Jummah Masjid in Kamachchode, Negombo is one of the oldest in Sri Lanka. Another old Msajid in Negombo is the Udayar Thoppuwa Mosque, Mirigama Road, Dheen Junction, Negombo which was built in 1846 by Maththicham Saleem Lebbe Muhammed Thamby Vidane and the old building which was built in 1846 is still in use.

Local government 
Negombo City Local Board began in 1878. After 44 years, it became the Urban District Council on 1 January 1922. Negombo celebrated its silver jubilee of its Urban council status in grand style in February 1948. Their Royal Highnesses the Duke and Duchess of Gloucester were the main patrons on the opening day of the celebrations. The Negombo Urban Council was offered Municipal status on 1 January 1950 under the municipal ordinance of 1865.

The Negombo Municipal Council has governed the city with a mayor from the government, since 1950. Negombo's mayor and the council members are elected through the local government election held every five years. There are 29 wards in the Negombo municipal boundary. Each is represented by an elected member, but  there were only 26 members before the Local Government election held in 2018. The number of municipal councillors was increased to 48 according to new local government election system introduced in 2018. where 29 members are elected form wards and the rest form a preferential list.

In the Local Government Election held in 2018, United National Party Won the Negombo Municipal council led by former Western Provincial councillor Royce Fernando by securing 19 seats and Sri Lanka Podujana Peramuna led By Dayan Lanza, brother of Nimal Lanza (MP) secured 16 Seats. The rest of seats were distributed among other political Parties and independent groups including Sri Lanka Freedom Party. Dayan Lanza became the Mayor of Negombo with the support of minor political parties and Sri Lanka Freedom Party. Royce Fernando Became the Opposition Leader in Negombo Municipal council.

Economy 
Negombo is considered one of the largest economic centres of the country. Negombo has a moderate port (used during the periods of Portuguese and Dutch colonisation)

The economy of Negombo is mainly based on tourism and its centuries-old fishing industry, though it also produces cinnamon, ceramics, and brass ware.

The Colombo Stock Exchange-Negombo branch and many major financial corporations have their key branches in Negombo. There are department stores, large supermarkets, and boutiques in the bustling streets of Downtown Negombo and international food outlets are being opened.

Education 
Negombo is home to some of the oldest secondary educational institutes in Sri Lanka. The leading schools are listed below.

 Ave Maria Convent
 Maris Stella College
 St. Mary's College, Negombo 
 Newstead Girls College
 Harischandra National College
 Loyola College
 Wijayaratnam Hindu Central College
 St. Joseph's College (Negombo Branch School of St Joseph's College, Colombo)
 St. Peter's College  (Negombo Branch School of St Peter's College, Colombo)
 Maris Stella Branch College
 Ave Maria Dominican Convent
 Al-Hilal Muslim Central College
 St. Peter's Maha Vidyalaya
 Vidyalankara Maha Vidyalaya
 St Sebastian's Maha vidyalaya, Sea Street
 St Anne's Maha Vidyalaya- Daluwakotuwa
 St.Anne's Maha Vidyalaya-Kurana
 Nimala Maria Maha Vidyalaya-Bolawalana
 Al-Falah Muslim School
 Vidyaloka Vidyalaya
 Our Lady of Miracle School
 St Joseph's Vidyalaya
 St Mary's Pitipana Maha Vidyalaya
 Kochchikade Maha Vidyalaya
 Gateway College
 St.Thomas Catholic International College
 Leeds International College
 St.Nicholas International College
 NICE International College
 Adventist International College
 OKI International School
 St.Michael's International School
 Negombo International College
 Sussex College
 JMC International School
 Negombo South International School
 Wisdom International School
 Sailan International School

There are also many higher educational institutes and private tuition institutes in Negombo: Ocean University of Sri Lanka Negombo facultynconducts Nautical Engineering, Marine Science, Fisheries and other degree programmes. BCI Campus, Regent Language School, American College of Higher Education, IPM Institute of Sri Lanka, ESOFT Metro Campus, AIMS College, ACBS, ACCHE, SLIMM, Australian Higher Educational Centre, Electro Technical Institute and Don Bosco Technical College are some of them.

Notable people

British Ceylon 
William Mohotti Munasinghe, Aide-de-camp to the British Governor and Mudaliyar of Negombo
Mudaliyar John de Silva Wijegooneratne Rajapakshe (d.1909) 
Muhammed Thamby Samsudheen Vidane Arachchi a.k.a Dheen Arachchi (1860 – 1915)  - He was the Vidane Arachchi of Negombo from 1896 to 1915, the highest position held by a Muslim in Negombo in the Native Department. After completing the Cambridge Senior Examination he got involved in managing the family estates before being appointed as the Vidane Arachchi. He was the  third child of Maththicham Saleem Lebbe Muhammed Thamby Vidane (1819–1879). Dheen Junction  in Negombo is named after him. Udayar Thoppuwa Mosque  at Dheen Junction in Negombo was built by his father in 1846. The Masjid is maintained by his descendants, who continue to preserve the original building.
A. E. Rajapakse (13 March 1866 – 20 September 1937), was the first chairman of the Negombo Urban Council (1922–1923, 1925–1934). He was the eldest son of Mudliyar John de Silva Wijegooneratne Rajapakshe. Rajapakse Park and Rajapakse Broadway in Negombo are named after him.
Samsudheen M. Abdul Raheeman (1896 – 1965), was the first Muslim chairman of the Negombo Urban Council (20 November 1941 to 31 December 1943). He was the second Muslim (first was his elder brother S. I. Dheen) to qualify as a lawyer in Negombo and was the 8th (1st Muslim) President (1948–1958) of the Negombo Law Society. He was the fourth child of Muhammed Thamby Samsudheen Vithane Arachchi a.k.a Dheen Arachchi Raheemanabad  in Periyamulla Negombo is named after him

Post-colonial Sri Lanka 
Mudaliyar T. David Mendis, founder and owner of Wijaya Bus Company, which was nationalised on 1 January 1958. Mudaliyar Mendis Mawatha in Negombo is named after him.
Thomas Cooray (28 December 1901 – 29 October 1988), first indigenous Archbishop of Colombo (1947 - 1976) and first Sri Lankan Cardinal (1965 - 1988).
Wijayapala Mendis (16 December 1928 - 1 September 2012), was elected the Mayor of Negombo in 1954 and entered Parliament in 1960 from the Katana electorate as a UNP candidate. He was appointed Minister of Textile Industries in 1977, in 1989 he became the Minister of Transport and Highways, In 1993 he was appointed Leader of the House and in 1994 he became the Chief Opposition Whip in Parliament which he served till 1998.  He was the  third child of Mudliyar T. David Mendis of Negombo.Wijayapala Mendis Road in Negombo is named after him.
Frank Marcus Fernando (19 October 1931 - 24 August 2009), served as Bishop of the Roman Catholic Diocese of Chilaw (1972 - 2006).
Nicholas Fernando (6 December 1932 - 10 April 2020), served as Archbishop of the  Roman Catholic Archdiocese of Colombo (1977 - 2002).
Ranjan Ramanayake (11 March 1963), was an actor, director and screenwriter before entering Parliament in 2010 as the member for Ratnapura. In 2015 he was elected as a member for Gampaha. He served as the State Minister of Highways and Road Development (2018-2019).

See also 
Negombo Lagoon 
Bandaranaike International Airport
Colombo-Katunayake Expressway 
Kandawala
Negombo Tamils
Bharatakula
RAF Negombo
Place names in Sri Lanka

References

Notes

External links 

Negombo Municipal Council

 
Populated places in Gampaha District
Populated places in Western Province, Sri Lanka